Events in the year 1728 in Norway.

Incumbents
Monarch: Frederick IV

Events

Arts and literature

Births

4 July – Peder Harboe Hertzberg, potato priest (died 1802).
6 September – Christian Braunmann Tullin, businessman and poet (died 1765).

Deaths
Jørgen Otto Brockenhuus, military officer (born 1664).

See also

References